The Tanzanian Embassy in Stockholm was established in 1964.

Embassy locations
The first Embassy was at Narvavägen 7 before moving to Sandhamnsgatan 40. It was at Oxtorgsgatan 24 (Regeringsgatan 67) from June 1974 to December 2001 and from 2001 to 2006 the Embassy was at Wallingatan 11. Since then, the Embassy is located at Näsby Alle 6 near Näsby Park in Täby.

Ambassadors
Dr. Willibrod Slaa 2017-2021
Dora Mmari Msechu 2014-2017
Muhammed Mwinyi Mzale 2010-2014
Dr. Ben Moses 2005-2008
James L. Kateka 1998-2005
Wilson K. Tibaijuka 1994-1998
Mohamed Ramia Abdiwawa 1990-1994
Daniel N. Mloka 1983-1989
J.F. Edward Mhina 1977-1983
Chief Michael Lukumbuzya 1969-1977
Philemon Muro 1964-1969

References

External links
Wilbrod Peter Slaa in Swedish Wikipedia

Lists of ambassadors of Tanzania